The 1961 All-Big Eight Conference football team consists of American football players chosen by various organizations for All-Big Eight Conference teams for the 1961 NCAA University Division football season.  The selectors for the 1961 season included the Associated Press (AP) and the United Press International (UPI).  Players selected as first-team players by both the AP and UPI are designated in bold.

All-Big Eight selections

Backs
 John Hadl, Kansas (AP-1; UPI-1)
 Dave Hoppman, Iowa State (AP-1; UPI-1)
 Curtis McClinton, Kansas (AP-1; UPI-1)
 Bill Thornton, Nebraska (AP-1)
 Gale Weidner, Colorado (UPI-1)

Ends
 Jerry Hillebrand, Colorado (AP-1; UPI-1)
 Conrad Hitchler, Missouri (AP-1; UPI-1)

Tackles
 Edward Blaine, Missouri (AP-1; UPI-1)
 Billy White, Oklahoma (AP-1; UPI-1)

Guards
 Joe Romig, Colorado (AP-1; UPI-1) (College Football Hall of Fame)
 Dan Celoni, Iowa State (AP-1; UPI-1)

Centers
 Walter Klinker, Colorado, (AP-1; UPI-1)

Key
AP = Associated Press

UPI = United Press International

See also
 1961 College Football All-America Team

References

All-Big Seven Conference football team
All-Big Eight Conference football teams